Amos is a 1985 American made-for-television drama film directed by Michael Tuchner and written by Richard Kramer. It is based on the 1983 novel Amos: To Ride a Dead Horse by Stanley Gordon West. The film stars Kirk Douglas, Elizabeth Montgomery, Dorothy McGuire, Pat Morita, James Sloyan and Ray Walston. The film premiered on CBS on September 29, 1985.

Plot
The opening of the start of the movie reveals a couple having breakfast, then going on a road trip or outing, when suddenly Amos (Kirk Douglas), who was driving, and his wife are involved in a major accident that claims the life of his wife and severely injures Amos.  He wakes up in a hospital, to realize that his wife died as a result of the accident and his home has been sold.

Amos is sent to the Sunset Nursing Home. There he meets an old baseball friend and gets in a relationship with a female resident. The head nurse, Daisy Daws (Elizabeth Montgomery), is notorious for running the facility with strict rules that are enforced by Roland, an orderly (male CNA). Daisy also has an affair with the local Sheriff so none of the residents dares to complain about her. Even when a County Commissioner, Burt, pays a surprise visit he is only told good things about the facility and Daisy.

One night, Daisy administers an overdose of a barbiturates to Amos' roommate, while Amos pretends to be sleeping, he watches it happen and can't do anything about it. Later, after the remains are picked up by morticians, Amos questions Daisy of why she did that and she threatens to do the same to him unless he puts his life insurance policy in her name.

Amos grandson pays him a visit in the nursing home and offers to let Amos come with him and live in his home but Amos does not want to abandon his friends in the nursing home.

Amos then sneaks into Daisy's bedroom to steal a syringe, needle, and the barbiturates which were used to euthanize her residents. He picks a fight with Roland so that he suffers bruises and other skin injuries, injects himself with the barbiturates and is found dead the next morning. Just before he administered his own lethal injection, he had written a letter to the state that Daisy forced him to put his life insurance on her name, that he fears she will kill him and that if he dies an autopsy should be performed and that the benefits from his life insurance policy should be shared between his grandson and Hester, his girlfriend at the nursing home.

Faced with the letter that Amos wrote and the results of the autopsy (which reveals "enough barbiturates to kill seven people"), the Sheriff arrests Daisy (despite her screams and threats to expose the Sheriff's infidelity).

Cast 
Kirk Douglas as Amos Lasher
Elizabeth Montgomery as Daisy Daws
Dorothy McGuire as Hester Farrell
Pat Morita as Tommy Tanaka
James Sloyan as Sheriff John Thomas
Ray Walston as Johnny Kent
Jerry Hausner as Sol Kessler
Don Keefer as Winston Beard
Camila Ashland as Mildred Lasher
Frances Bay as Lydia
Frederick Coffin as Roland
Lois de Banzie as Dorothy Dearborn
Helen Martin as Mrs. McKenzie
Royce Wallace as Helen
Pamela Dunlap as Leah
Jack Blessing as Scott Lasher
Jordan Charney as Commissioner Bert Daniels

References

External links
 

1985 television films
1985 films
1985 drama films
Bryna Productions films
1980s English-language films
CBS network films
Films directed by Michael Tuchner
American drama television films
1980s American films